Pseudoxanthomonas koreensis is a species of Gram-negative, non-spore-forming, rod-shaped bacteria, first isolated from ginseng fields. T7-09(T) (=KCTC 12208(T) =IAM 15116(T)) is the type strain.

References

Further reading
Whitman, William B., et al., eds. Bergey's manual® of systematic bacteriology. Vol. 3. Springer, 2012.

External links

LPSN
Type strain of Pseudoxanthomonas koreensis at BacDive -  the Bacterial Diversity Metadatabase

Xanthomonadales
Bacteria described in 2005